Elmore James ( Brooks; January 27, 1918 – May 24, 1963) was an American blues guitarist, singer, songwriter, and bandleader. Noted for his use of loud amplification and his stirring voice, James was inducted into the Rock and Roll Hall of Fame in 1992. His slide guitar technique earned him the nickname "King of the Slide Guitar".

Biography
Elmore James was born Elmore Brooks in Richland, Holmes County, Mississippi, the son of 15-year-old Leola Brooks, a field hand. His father was probably Joe Willie "Frost" James, who moved in with Leola, and Elmore took his surname. He began making music at the age of 12, using a simple one-string instrument (diddley bow, or jitterbug) strung on a shack wall. As a teen he performed at dances under the names Cleanhead and Joe Willie James.

James was influenced by Robert Johnson, Kokomo Arnold and Tampa Red. He recorded several of Tampa Red's songs. He also inherited from Tampa Red's band two musicians who joined his own backing band, the Broomdusters, "Little" Johnny Jones (piano) and Odie Payne (drums). In the late 1930s, James worked alongside Sonny Boy Williamson II.

During World War II, James joined the U.S. Navy, was promoted to coxswain and took part in the invasion of Guam. Upon his discharge, he returned to central Mississippi and settled in the town of Canton with his adopted brother Robert Holston.

He began recording with Trumpet Records in nearby Jackson in January 1951, first as a sideman again for Sonny Boy Williamson II and for their mutual friend Willie Love and possibly others. He made his debut as a session leader in August with "Dust My Broom", which was a surprise R&B hit in 1952. His backing musicians became known as the Broomdusters.

James broke his contract with Trumpet Records to sign with the Bihari brothers through their scout Ike Turner, who played guitar and piano on a couple of his early Bihari recordings. His "I Believe" was a hit a year later. During the 1950s he recorded for the Bihari brothers' Flair Records, Meteor Records, and Modern Records; he also recorded for Chess Records and Mel London's Chief Records. He played lead guitar on Big Joe Turner's 1954 top 10 R&B hit "TV Mama".

In 1959, he began recording for Bobby Robinson's Fire Records, which released "The Sky Is Crying", "My Bleeding Heart", "Stranger Blues", "Look on Yonder Wall", "Done Somebody Wrong", and "Shake Your Moneymaker", among others.

James died of a heart attack in Chicago in 1963, as he was about to tour Europe with that year's American Folk Blues Festival. He was buried in the Newport Baptist Church Cemetery, in Ebenezer, Mississippi. Phil Walden of Capricorn Records raised funds for a granite headstone for James's grave. The headstone which reads "King of the Slide Guitar", features a bronze relief of James playing guitar. It was revealed at a dedication ceremony sponsored by the Mt. Zion Memorial Fund in 1992.

James was posthumously inducted into the Rock and Roll Hall of Fame in 1992 as an "Early Influence" inductee. In 2012, he was honored with a marker on the Mississippi Blues Trail in Ebenezer.

Influence
James influenced many slide players, such as blues guitarists Homesick James, Hound Dog Taylor, and J. B. Hutto. His single string playing also influenced B.B. King and Chuck Berry. Rock guitarists Jimi Hendrix, Brian Jones, Jeremy Spencer, and Frank Zappa have acknowledged his influence. In the Beatles' song "For You Blue", John Lennon plays a slide solo on a Höfner lap steel guitar; George Harrison encourages him with "Go, Johnny, go... Elmore James got nothin' on this, baby".

Discography

Selected singles
 "Dust My Broom" (1951 & 1965)
 "I Believe" (1953)
 "Standing at the Crossroads" (1954 & 1965)
 "Dust My Blues" (1955)
 "It Hurts Me Too" (1957 & 1965)
 "The Sky Is Crying" (1960)
 "I Can't Hold Out" (1960)
 "Rollin' and Tumblin'" (1960)
 "Shake Your Moneymaker" (1961)
 "Look on Yonder Wall" (1961)
 "Bleeding Heart" (1965)
 "One Way Out" (1965)
 "Every Day I Have the Blues" (1965)

Selected compilation albums
 Blues After Hours (1960)
 Whose Muddy Shoes (1969) (split album with John Brim)
 Street Talkin''' (1975)
 King of the Slide Guitar (1992)
 The Classic Early Recordings: 1951–1956 (1993)
 The Sky Is Crying: The History of Elmore James (1993)
 Golden Hits'' (1996)

References

External links
Illustrated Elmore James discography
Elmore James | Mount Zion Memorial Fund
1980 Blues Foundation Hall of Fame Inductee

1918 births
1963 deaths
People from Holmes County, Mississippi
American blues singers
Trumpet Records artists
Flair Records artists
Meteor Records artists
USA Records artists
Checker Records artists
Modern Records artists
Chess Records artists
Crown Records artists
Blues musicians from Mississippi
American blues guitarists
American male guitarists
Slide guitarists
20th-century American guitarists
Guitarists from Mississippi
Mississippi Blues Trail
African-American guitarists
20th-century African-American male singers